Alexander Forrest Hunter (1898 – 1981) was a Scottish footballer who played as a full back (comfortable in either the right or left berth) for Hamilton Academical, Motherwell and Bo'ness .

Between 1921 and 1928 he played 200 times for hometown club Hamilton, who were members of the Scottish Football League's top division throughout the period. He served a brief loan at Dumbarton in 1926 which consisted of one appearance in the Scottish Cup.

After moving to Accies''' Lanarkshire derby rivals Motherwell in a swap deal involving winger Frank Wilson, Hunter was a regular in the defence for two seasons in which the club finished second then third in the league table, and took part in the 1931 Scottish Cup Final which the Steelmen'' lost to Celtic after a replay, having led in the first match until the final minute, and was praised in press reports for his performance in both games. Technically he was also a member of the squad that won the league title in 1931–32, but he had fallen out favour at Fir Park and made only one appearance in that campaign before moving on to second-level Bo'ness mid-season; he then returned to Hamilton for a second spell as a veteran in a back-up role.

References

1898 births
1981 deaths
Date of death unknown
Scottish footballers
Footballers from Hamilton, South Lanarkshire
Scottish Junior Football Association players
Association football defenders
Larkhall Thistle F.C. players
Hamilton Academical F.C. players
Motherwell F.C. players
Dumbarton F.C. players
Bo'ness F.C. players
Scottish Football League players